This is a list of members of the Victorian Legislative Assembly from 1992 to 1996, as elected at the 1992 state election:

 On 28 June 1993, the Labor member for Broadmeadows, Jim Kennan, resigned. Labor candidate John Brumby won the resulting by-election on 18 September 1993.
 In March 1994, the Labor member for Coburg, Tom Roper, resigned. Labor candidate Carlo Carli won the resulting by-election on 14 May 1994.
 On 27 May 1994, the Labor member for Williamstown and former Premier of Victoria, Joan Kirner, resigned. Labor candidate Steve Bracks won the resulting by-election on 13 August 1994.
 Bob Sercombe and Kelvin Thomson, respectively the Labor members for Niddrie and Pascoe Vale, resigned in February 1996 to contest seats at the 1996 federal election. Rob Hulls was elected unopposed to Niddrie at the close of nominations on 29 February 1996. Two nominations were received for Pascoe Vale by 29 February for a 30 March by-election, but the by-election was cancelled when the state election was called for the same day.

Members of the Parliament of Victoria by term
20th-century Australian politicians